National Bank of Bahrain (NBB) was established in 1957 as the first indigenous bank in Bahrain. They are a nationwide network of 25 branches, 61 ATMs, and over 4,000 points of sale terminals in addition to their branches in Abu Dhabi and Riyadh.

Major shareholders
Bahrain Mumtalakat Holding Company (Bahrain) 49%, The Pension Fund Commission (Bahrain) 6.24%.

References

1957 establishments in Bahrain
Banks of Bahrain
Banks established in 1957
Companies listed on the Bahrain Bourse
Companies based in Manama